Coșești is a commune in Argeș County, Muntenia, Romania. It is composed of seven villages: Coșești, Jupânești, Lăpușani, Leicești, Păcioiu, Petrești and Priseaca.

References

Communes in Argeș County
Localities in Muntenia